Pascal Wehrlein (born 18 October 1994) is a German-Mauritian racing driver for the Porsche Formula E Team. He previously raced in Formula One for the Sauber and Manor teams. Holding dual nationality of Germany and Mauritius, he raced under the German flag in Formula One. He is one of only two black drivers to compete in Formula One (the other being Lewis Hamilton). He had previously raced in DTM, winning the title with the Mercedes-Benz team HWA AG in 2015. In 2014 Wehrlein became the youngest driver to win a DTM race at the age of 19, and the following year he was the youngest to win the title, at the age of 20.

In February 2016 he began driving full-time in Formula One for Manor, scoring his first championship point at the Austrian Grand Prix. During the season, he regularly out-qualified his lesser rated team mate Rio Haryanto, until Haryanto was replaced mid-season by Esteban Ocon.

Manor folded in early 2017 and Wehrlein moved to Sauber. However, before the season began, he was involved in an accident at the Race of Champions that left him unable to compete in the first two races of the season. Despite this, he scored Sauber's only points that year. He was replaced for the 2018 season by Charles Leclerc.

Wehrlein later raced in Formula E with the Indian Mahindra team alongside Jérôme d'Ambrosio, but left the team midway through the 2019–2020 championship season.

Early life 
Wehrlein was born in Sigmaringen to a German father and Mauritian mother. His father Richard Wehrlein, who entered German boxing championships, owns a CNC machining company in Ostrach.

Early career

Karting
Wehrlein began karting in 2003 and raced only in his native Germany in his early career. He worked his way up from the junior ranks to progress through to the KF2 category by 2009, when he finished on fifth position in ADAC Kart Masters.

ADAC Formel Masters
2010 saw his debut in the ADAC Formel Masters championship with ADAC Berlin-Brandenburg e.V. (also known as Mücke Motorsport). Wehrlein finished sixth in the championship with a win at Sachsenring and three other podiums.
He remained in the series with the team for the next year. Wehrlein scored seven wins at Oschersleben, Sachsenring, Zolder, Nürburgring and Lausitz on his way to the championship title.

Formula 3 Euro Series
In 2012, Wehrlein stepped up to the Formula 3 Euro Series, continuing with Mücke Motorsport. He finished 2nd in the championship to Daniel Juncadella.

DTM 

Wehrlein made his debut in the Deutsche Tourenwagen Masters (DTM) in 2013 at the age of 18. In a career spanning three seasons Wehrlein managed to be one of the leading drivers in the field despite his youthful age.

In his debut season he achieved 3 points finishing 22nd in the championship. He also achieved his first of two fastest laps in his career.

In 2014 he switched teams to HWA where he became the youngest driver in the series history to claim pole position and win a race on route to 8th in the championship with 46 points collected. Besides his stand out victory at Lausitz, Wehrlein's second best result of the season was a fifth-place finish at Norisring.

In 2015 DTM returned to running two races per race weekend, resulting in 18 rounds in the 2015 championship. Due to the inconsistency of most teams and drivers Wehrlein won the title easily having scored in all rounds except for three. He achieved 5 podiums, one fastest lap and two wins. He is the first driver to win the championship having not claimed a pole position throughout his championship season while also being the youngest ever DTM champion.

Formula One 

In September 2014, it was announced that Wehrlein would act as a reserve driver for the Mercedes F1 Team and was signed up to be their first junior driver. He took part in preseason testing in Barcelona, driving for both Force India and Mercedes.

Manor (2016) 

On 10 February 2016, it was announced that Wehrlein would make his F1 debut with Manor Racing. It is understood that Manor would receive access to Mercedes's wind tunnel in exchange for hiring Wehrlein. He picked number 94, in reference to his birth year.

Sauber (2017) 

On 16 January 2017, Wehrlein signed with Sauber. He was forced to miss the first test in Barcelona due to an injury he sustained while competing in the Race of Champions. He was replaced by Antonio Giovinazzi before returning for the second test at the same circuit. On 3 April 2017, Sauber F1 announced Wehrlein would again be replaced by Giovinazzi for the 2017 Chinese Grand Prix. He proceeded with entry into the following Bahrain Grand Prix, qualifying 13th and finishing the race in 11th. He finished eighth in the Spanish Grand Prix after running a one-stop strategy. He did not lose a single one of the places he gained, although a five-second penalty for a pit entry violation cost him seventh to Carlos Sainz Jr. His race at the Monaco Grand Prix ended when, on the 57th lap, Jenson Button tried to lunge down the inside at Portier but succeeded in flipping the Sauber onto its side against the barriers, necessitating another scan of his back. He scored his second points finish of the season in the chaotic Azerbaijan Grand Prix after fighting hard with his teammate Marcus Ericsson for 10th position. This took his points tally to 5 points. Despite having beaten Ericsson in both qualifying and the majority of races, plus being the only driver who scored points for Sauber that season, on 2 December 2017, Sauber announced that Wehrlein would not be renewed for the 2018 season and that he would be replaced by Charles Leclerc.

Ferrari test driver (2019–2020) 
On 8 January 2019 Wehrlein was announced as the development driver for Ferrari.

Return to DTM 
On 7 February 2018, it was announced that Wehrlein would return to DTM with Mercedes-AMG's HWA Team after losing his Formula One seat to Charles Leclerc. During the 2018 DTM season Wehrlein achieved one podium and finished the championship in 8th. 

After that season, Wehrlein left the Mercedes Junior Team. He also stopped being a Mercedes factory driver.

Formula E

Mahindra Racing (2019–2020) 
Wehrlein moved to Formula E for the 2018–19 season, driving for Mahindra Racing. He did not contest the opening round of the season in Diriyah, with Felix Rosenqvist replacing him, instead making his debut at the Marrakesh ePrix. Wehrlein earned his first pole position in just his third race in the series at the Mexico City ePrix. In the race he crossed the finish line in second, 0.210s behind Lucas di Grassi after being overtaken in the last corner, but was given a 5-second time penalty for cutting a corner earlier in the race which relegated him to sixth position. He set the fastest qualifying time in the qualifying session for the Paris ePrix, but he and teammate d'Ambrosio had their times disallowed for underweight cars, promoting Oliver Rowland to pole position. On 8 June 2020, Wehrlein announced his departure from the Mahindra team in a post on Instagram.

TAG Heuer Porsche (2021–present) 

Wehrlein was signed up to drive for the Porsche Formula E team for the 2020-21 Formula E World Championship. Wehrlein replaced Neel Jani and partnered with fellow countryman André Lotterer. Wehrlein took pole at the Puebla ePrix and crossed the finish line first, before being disqualified after his team failed to declare his tyre set.

Both drivers were retained for the 2021-22 season. Wehrlein took pole in the championship's third round at the Autódromo Hermanos Rodríguez in Mexico City and went on to win the race, claiming his and Porsche's maiden Formula E victory as well as Porsche's first 1-2 finish, with Lotterer crossing the line in second place, making him the first black person and first person of colour to win a Formula E race.

For the 2023 season, Wehrlein remained with the German manufacturer, entering the Gen3 era alongside António Félix da Costa. His season began in style as, having finished second in the season opener in Mexico City, Wehrlein managed to charge through to victory during Race 1 in Diriyah after starting from ninth place. Wehrlein managed to continue his successful weekend in Saudi Arabia, winning the second race and taking the championship lead. A fourth place in Hyderabad extended his advantage to Jake Dennis in the standings, however the German would crash out of the Cape Town ePrix on the opening lap, missing his braking point and colliding with the back of Sébastien Buemi's car.

Racing record

Karting career summary

Racing career summary 

* Season still in progress.

Complete ADAC Formel Masters results 
(key)

Complete Formula 3 Euro Series results
(key)

Complete FIA Formula 3 European Championship results
(key)

Complete Deutsche Tourenwagen Masters results
(key) (Races in bold indicate pole position) (Races in italics indicate fastest lap)

† Driver did not finish, but completed 75% of the race distance.

Complete Formula One results
(key) (Races in bold indicate pole position; races in italics indicate fastest lap)

Complete Formula E results
(key) (Races in bold indicate pole position; races in italics indicate fastest lap)

* Season still in progress.

References

External links

  
 

1994 births
Living people
ADAC Formel Masters drivers
British Formula Three Championship drivers
Deutsche Tourenwagen Masters champions
Deutsche Tourenwagen Masters drivers
FIA Formula 3 European Championship drivers
Formula 3 Euro Series drivers
German Formula One drivers
German people of Mauritian descent
German racing drivers
People from Sigmaringen
Sportspeople from Tübingen (region)
Manor Formula One drivers
Sauber Formula One drivers
Formula E drivers
Mücke Motorsport drivers
HWA Team drivers
Mercedes-AMG Motorsport drivers
Mahindra Racing drivers
Porsche Formula E Team drivers
Porsche Motorsports drivers
Racing drivers from Baden-Württemberg
Campos Racing drivers